Allan Irwin Basbaum is a Canadian-American medical researcher, and professor and chair of the Department of Anatomy at the University of California, San Francisco. He is a Fellow of the American Academy of Arts and Sciences. He is a member of the Institute of Medicine. and a Fellow of the Royal Society in the United Kingdom. From 2003 to 2012 he was editor-in-chief of Pain, the journal of the International Association for the Study of Pain. He was elected a member of the National Academy of Sciences in April 2019.

Education
BSc - McGill University, Montreal, Quebec, Canada
PhD - University Pennsylvania, Philadelphia, PA
PostDoc - University College London, London, UK
PostDoc - University California San Francisco, San Francisco, CA

References

External links
http://www.nationalpainfoundation.org/articles/893/pioneers-in-pain-medicine

British medical researchers
Fellows of the Royal Society
University of California, San Francisco faculty
Fellows of the American Academy of Arts and Sciences
Living people
Year of birth missing (living people)
Canadian medical researchers
Members of the National Academy of Medicine
Medical journal editors
Members of the United States National Academy of Sciences
American medical researchers